Francisco Alberto Limardo Gascón (born March 27, 1987 in Ciudad Bolívar) is a Venezuelan épée fencer. He is the brother of Rubén Limardo, who won Venezuela's first gold medal from a forty-four year drought at the 2012 Summer Olympics in London.

Limardo competed as a member of the national fencing team at the 2008 Summer Olympics in Beijing, along with his brother Ruben, and compatriots Wolfgang Mejías and Silvio Fernández. Limardo and his team, however, lost the fifth place match of men's team épée to the Hungarian team (led by Géza Imre), with a total score of 20 touches.

References

External links
Profile – FIE
NBC 2008 Olympics profile

Venezuelan male épée fencers
Living people
Olympic fencers of Venezuela
Fencers at the 2008 Summer Olympics
Fencers at the 2016 Summer Olympics
People from Ciudad Bolívar
1987 births
Pan American Games medalists in fencing
Pan American Games gold medalists for Venezuela
Central American and Caribbean Games gold medalists for Venezuela
Competitors at the 2014 Central American and Caribbean Games
South American Games gold medalists for Venezuela
South American Games medalists in fencing
Fencers at the 2011 Pan American Games
Competitors at the 2010 South American Games
Central American and Caribbean Games medalists in fencing
Medalists at the 2011 Pan American Games
21st-century Venezuelan people